= Machine building in Azerbaijan =

The main areas of machine building are the preparation of machine tools, equipment of tractors and automobiles, shipbuilding, aircraft building, Agricultural Machine Building, Electrical Engineering, Radio Engineering and automation equipment.

== History ==
Extraction of oil by industrial method started in 1848 in Baku. The first metal processing plant was built in 1858 in Baku. In 1859, the oil refining plant was put into operation in Baku. In subsequent years, mechanical engineering and metalworking enterprises were established to serve these sectors due to the development of oil, chemistry and shipping.

During 1911–1913 years, there were 12 machine-building plants in Baku, and 127 metalworking enterprises were operating in Baku at the beginning of World War I. 8066 people worked in the construction of those enterprises.

During the Second World War, mainly spare parts for military technic, military equipment and weapons were produced in the machine–building plants moved from many industrial cities of the former Soviet Union to Baku. The development of the machine-building industry in the Republic is related to the development of the oil industry in the late 19th and early 20th century. The equipment imported from abroad was repaired in the workshops of the Nobel brothers, Rothschild, Taghiyev, Mukhtarov, Benkendorf in subsequent years. These workshops are the basis of future machine-building plants. During the Great Patriotic War, 95% of productive capacity of Azerbaijan's machine-building enterprises was directed to the production of military technic and equipment.

The majority of machine-building equipment of Azerbaijan are produced by enterprises that are part of “Azneftkimyamash” OJSC. In the past, about 70% of the equipment using for oil and gas extraction and repairs of wells in the entire oil-producing area of the Soviet Union belonged to Azerbaijan. The history of the oil and gas machine building industry of Azerbaijan dates back to 1935.

"Azneftkimyamash" Open Joint Stock Company was established on the basis of the State Company "Azneftkimyamash" by the Presidential Decree No 649 on March 22, 2001. Thus, the Azerbaijan Petroleum Machine building Industry entered a new stage.

The foundation of the Baku Deepwater Jackets Factory was laid in 1978. Baku Deepwater Jackets Factory was commissioned in 1984, is a one of giant industrial enterprise producing welding electrodes and performed pipe painting works in Azerbaijan. Overall area of the factory consists of 315, 57 ha and coastal area was 200 ha. The first stationary offshore platform constructed in 1985 is currently being operated at the Gunashli field. After signing the "Contract of the Century" on September 20, 1994, the Baku Deepwater Jackets Factory participates in all oil projects implemented in the Azerbaijani sector of the Caspian Sea.

== Baku Petroleum Machine-Building Plant ==
"Baku Petroleum Machine-Building Plant" Subsidiary Open Joint Stock Company was created in 2009 as a result of the combination of "Machine-Building Plant named after Sattarkhan" SOJSC and “Baku Oil Mine Machine-Building Plant” SOJSC by the decision of the Cabinet of Ministers of Azerbaijan. The drilled rotors, fixtures and valves are produced by the plant. As well as it is specialized in manufacturing of the different types of oil and mining tool. An area of it is 19.6 ha and 314 people worked at plant.

== "Baku Worker Machine-Building Plant" ==
"Baku Worker Machine-Building Plant" SOJSC has been operating since 1900, and was united with “Keshla Machine-Building Plant”. The plant which has the ISO certificate is specialized in the production of oil and mining equipment, rocker machines, cranes, drilling units and so on. In 2014, 380 people worked at the plant which has 16 ha area.

== "Surakhani Machine-Building Plant" ==
"Surakhani Machine-Building Plant" SOJSC has been operating since 1926. The area of plant is 13,6 ha. Plant produces underground mining equipments (deep well pumps) and as well as deep well pumps, gas-lift valves and packers. 359 people work at plant. The deep well pumps and packers are being exported to Kazakhstan and Russia. The plant has international API and ISO certificates.

== Sabunchu scientific production association ==
“Sabunchu scientific production association” SOJSC has been operating since 1914. The plant is specialized in the production of various type of Plant Machinery. The area of plant is 9.2 ha and 236 people work there. It has international ISO certificate.

== “Machine-Building Plant after B.Sardarov” ==
“Machine-Building Plant after B.Sardarov” Subsidiary Open Joint Stock Company has been operating since 1926. The plant covers 37 ha area and 160 people worked there. The plant produces oil industry equipment as well as valves, rotary cranes, fountain fixtures. Two manifolds were exported to Russia.

== Zabrat Machine-Building Plant ==
“Zabrat Machine-Building Plant” SOJSC has been operating since 1921. The area of it is 7 ha and 92 people work there. The plant which has the international ISO and API certificates, produces drilling rigs, mechanical derrick cranes, fuel and oil holding facilities.

== “Baku Oil and Gas Field Equipment Plant” ==
“Baku Oil and Gas Field Equipment Plant” SOJSC was established in 1967. The area of it is 1.5 ha. Equipments of oil and gas sector was produced by the company. The number of employees is 70 people.

== “Balakhani Machine-Building Plant” ==
“Balakhani Machine-Building Plant” SOJSC has been operating since 1900. Equipments of oil industry, valves, rotary cranes, fountain fixtures were produced by the company. It covers the 3 ha area. 84 people work at plant. Balakhani Machine-Building Plant also gained ISO international certificate.

== Sabail Machine-Building Plant ==
“Sabail Machine-Building Plant” SOJSC has been operating since 1906. Oil mining equipments and elevators were produced at the plant. The area of it is 1.9 ha and the number of employees is 37.
